Dominik Fleitmann is professor of palaeoclimatology and archaeology at the University of Reading. According to Fleitmann, his research into stalagmites found in modern-day Saudi Arabia demonstrates a link between rainfall and human migration from the region, and a correlation between a period of severe drought and the collapse of the Kingdom of Himyar.

References 

Academics of the University of Reading
British archaeologists
Intergovernmental Panel on Climate Change contributing authors
Living people
Year of birth missing (living people)